The Canboulay riots were a series of disturbances in the British colony of Trinidad in 1881. The riots came about in response to efforts by the colonial police to restrict aspects of the island's annual Carnival festival. In Port of Spain, San Fernando and Princes Town, angered Trinidadians rioted in response to the actions of the police; several people were killed as a result of the riots. Canboulay music forms an important part the musical traditions of Trinidad. The "chantwell" or chantuelle who was also an integral part of the celebrations was the forerunner of the calypsonian and later soca music.

Background 
The annual Carnival in Trinidad dates back to the 18th century, when an influx of immigrants from the French West Indies emigrated to Trinidad in the 1780s in response to encouragement from the Spanish colonial government. These immigrants included French planters (both white and Mulatto) and free and enslaved Blacks. Both the white and Mulatto planters staged elaborate masquerade balls at Christmas as a "farewell to the flesh" before the season of Lent, with each group mimicking the other in their masks and method of entertainment. Over time, the traditions of the Carnival were merged with another tradition introduced by French immigration- the calinda, a form of martial art accompanied by music and dancing. Trinidad was captured by the British in 1797, and in 1834, the British government passed the Slavery Abolition Act which outlawed slavery in the British Empire. Slavery was fully abolished in Trinidad by 1838, and the Carnival, hitherto restricted to the island's planters, became a tradition among Trinidad's emancipated slaves, who created the jammette (underclass) masquerade to participate in the festivities.

The emancipated slaves first celebrated their freedom on 1 August the anniversary of their emancipation but soon participated in Carnival instead. As part of this transformation, they started carrying burning sugar canes or "cannes brulees" which were soon called canboulay. The carnival soon featured ribald dancing by men and women in masks. The people would also gather in "kaiso" tents where a "chantwell" or lead singer would lead them in song to vent their feelings. "Kaiso" music has its origins in West Africa and was brought over by the slaves who (in the early history of the art form) used it to sing about their masters. The British colonial authorities disapproved of the festival because of its bacchanalian overtones, but the festival was popular with the majority of the population on the island. The Carnival was often marred by clashes between groups of revellers carrying sticks and lighted torches. While the confrontations started in song duels between the chantwells, they often worsened to physical violence. The colonial  authorities banned carrying sticks and torches in 1868 due to a clash between two groups. However, this ban was not enforced for some years.

Riots 

Captain Arthur Baker became the head of Trinidad's police force in the early 1880s and was determined to end the canboulay, which he perceived as a threat to public order. In 1881, the colonial police force clashed with revellers in Port of Spain who had banded together against them due to their restrictions. This caused resentment amongst the general public in Trinidad who valued the festival despite the clashes. Due to the feelings of the population, Governor Sir Sanford Freeling confined police to barracks in order to calm down the situation. However, when Freeling was recalled in 1883, Baker sought to crack down at the canboulay in the southern cities of San Fernando and Princes Town during the carnival of 1884. 

In Princes Town, the masqueraders attacked the police station after magistrate Hobson decided to confine the police to barracks because the crowd was too large. After Hobson was felled with a stone, the police opened fire on the rioters killing a youth and seriously wounding two others causing the crowd to flee. There were also serious clashes between police and rioters in San Fernando during Carnival, with the police eventually being able to suppress the riots and restore order.

Legacy 

The British colonial government’s attempt to ban canboulay in 1881 resulted in open riots between Afro-Creole revelers and police, a turn of events that caused deep resentment within Trinidadian society toward the colonial government. In 1883, drumming was banned in an attempt to prevent violence breaking out during the Carnival; with this injunction coming about after the Canboulay riots. Canboulays were processions during carnival that commemorated the harvesting of burnt cane fields during slavery. It was a labor-intensive process, involving forced marches of slaves from neighboring plantations in order to more efficiently harvest the cane. The open resistance of the revelers towards the police redoubled concerns among officials in the colonial government over this potential threat to public order and led to an alternative strategy - the banning of drumming - in 1883.

Stick-fighting itself was banned in 1884. A substitute for the drums and sticks, called tamboo bamboo, was introduced in the 1890s. A tamboo bamboo band is a percussion band used to accompany calypso songs during Carnival time. Tamboo bamboo bands consist of three different instruments, each cut from bamboo: boom, foulé, and cutter. The boom serves as the bass instrument, is usually about five feet long, and is played by stamping it on the ground. The foulé, which is a higher-pitched instrument, consists of two pieces of bamboo, each about a foot long, and is played by striking these pieces end to end. The cutter, which is the highest- pitched instrument in the ensemble, is made from a thinner piece of bamboo (of varying length) and is struck with a stick. These three types of instruments combined to beat out rhythms that accompanied the chantwells and were a staple of carnival celebrations for many years (they were gradually rendered obsolete by the steelband).

After the riots, the Carnival became more restrained. The bottle-and-spoon joined drums as percussion instruments. In the 1930s, steel pans became widely used and this music was popularised throughout the world when the US Navy set up a base in Trinidad and US sailors took the music of the "panmen" to the United States and hence throughout the world. Steel pan music remains an integral part of Canboulay music contests.

The Canboulay Riots are an important part of the history of Trinidad and are still celebrated today.

References

1984 article by Michael Anthony on the Canboulay Riot

Article by Brian Wong on the history of Carnival including the Canboulay riots
Excerpt from Professor Shannon Dudley's Carnival Music in Trinidad

1881 riots
1884 riots
February 1881 events
February 1884 events
Riots and civil disorder in Trinidad and Tobago